Violated may refer to:

 Violated (EP), a 1996 EP by Stuck Mojo
 Violated (1996 film), a Nigerian romantic drama film
 Violated!, a 1974 film directed by Albert Zugsmith.